Arto Kalervo Bryggare (born 26 May 1958 in Kouvola) is a Finnish former hurdling athlete. He was a member of the Parliament of Finland, representing the Social Democratic Party of Finland from 1995 to 1999 and 2003 to 2007. His personal best time 13.35, made during trials in 1984 Los Angeles Games, is still the record time in Finland and in Nordic countries. Bryggare made Finnish history by becoming the first Finn to medal in a sprint event shorter than 400 metres.

Biography
Undoubtedly, Bryggare was the finest ever Finnish high hurdler winning medals in almost every major championship he competed. In 1977, at only 18 years of age, he took the bronze over 60m hurdles at the European Indoor Championships and later that year he became European Junior champion at 110m hurdles. After such start that rocketed him to the European hurdling elite, he continued to improve and next year he was for the first time amongst the top ten high-hurdlers in the World with a time of 13.56 secs, which earned him bronze medal at the European Championships held in Prague. Bryggare began 1979 strongly, finishing second at European Indoors beaten only by the best European high-hurdler in 70's, Thomas Munkelt from East Germany. At 1980 Olympic Games held in Moscow, Bryggare easily advanced in the final of 110mh, but was unable to produce fast time and finished far from medals at 6th place. He continued improving and started 1981 with winning his first European Indoor title when he was winner over 50m hurdles at championships held in Grenoble. Next year he showed some consistency when competing at his second European Championships at Athens where he again finished at bronze medal position and again behind Munkelt, cementing his position in high-hurdling elite.

World silver in 1983, Olympic bronze in 1984

After becoming a real medal threat at the European level, Bryggare decided to get better and pick some major medals. He couldn't have better chance for that feat because inaugural World Championships were held on his home soil, at Helsinki in 1983. Bryggare was in fine form at championships setting new personal best prior to the final and in the final he finished close second, beaten only by great Greg Foster from USA. At the 1983 World lists, Bryggare was at fourth place with 13.44s reached at semi-finals at Helsinki. Encouraged with that, he travelled to 1984 Olympic Games in Los Angeles as possible medal chance at 110mh. However the U.S. team consisted of three great high-hurdlers and Bryggare had to be at his best to win an Olympic medal. He started bravely setting new personal best in a time of 13.35s in the heats and easily advanced to the final. In the final, he didn't produce another PB, but finished at 3rd place, grabbing the bronze medal behind Kingdom and Foster, in another great time of 13.40secs. After he reached the only medal he missed, Bryggare continued to compete for several more years and picked up more medals. His third successive medal at the Europeans came in 1986, in Stuttgart, where he finished at second place taking the silver and at the European Indoor Championships held in 1987 in Lieven, he was the winner over 60m hurdles beating rising star, Colin Jackson from Great Britain. Later that year he tried to repeat his medal performance at the World Championships in Rome where he qualified for the final, but was unable to start the race while he injured himself in his semi-final. Following that, Bryggare competed for several more seasons without success he enjoyed in previous years.

Bryggare attended the University of Southern California in Los Angeles, which features a distinguished track program.  He started his international career as a 20-year-old newcomer in the 1978 European Championships in Prague, barely winning bronze by just 2/100 seconds. This started a chain of victories still unique for a Finnish hurdler; for eight years Bryggare won a medal in every international race in which he participated. He ended his hurdling career in the 1992 Summer Olympics in Barcelona, where he considered having been as a "tourist".

International competitions

1Did not start in the final

References

External links 
  Official website

1958 births
Living people
People from Kouvola
Social Democratic Party of Finland politicians
Members of the Parliament of Finland (1995–99)
Members of the Parliament of Finland (2003–07)
Finnish sportsperson-politicians
Finnish male hurdlers
Athletes (track and field) at the 1980 Summer Olympics
Athletes (track and field) at the 1984 Summer Olympics
Athletes (track and field) at the 1992 Summer Olympics
Olympic athletes of Finland
Olympic bronze medalists for Finland
World Athletics Championships medalists
Finnish masters athletes
European Athletics Championships medalists
World Athletics Championships athletes for Finland
Medalists at the 1984 Summer Olympics
Olympic bronze medalists in athletics (track and field)
University of Southern California alumni